is a Japanese professional footballer who plays as a goalkeeper for Portuguese team Benfica B.

International career
Kokubo was born in Japan to a Nigerian father and Japanese mother. He is a youth international for Japan, having represented the Japan U16s and U18s.

Club statistics
.

Notes

References

2001 births
Living people
Association football people from Chiba Prefecture
Japanese footballers
Japan youth international footballers
Japanese people of Nigerian descent
Association football goalkeepers
Liga Portugal 2 players
Kashiwa Reysol players
S.L. Benfica B players
Japanese expatriate footballers
Japanese expatriate sportspeople in Portugal
Expatriate footballers in Portugal